Habib El Malki ( – born 15 April 1946, Boujad) is a Moroccan politician of the Socialist Union of Popular Forces party. He was Minister of Education in the cabinet of Driss Jettou (2002–2007) and Minister of Agriculture in the first cabinet of Abderrahman el-Yousfi (1998–2000). He is a professor of economics at the University of Mohammad V. He is a member of the Academy of the Kingdom of Morocco, and receiver of the "Grande médaille de la francophonie", an award from the Académie Française, which he obtained in 1993.

He served as president of the House of Representatives from 2017 to 2021.

See also
Cabinet of Morocco

References

1946 births
Living people
Education Ministers of Morocco
Government ministers of Morocco
Presidents of the House of Representatives (Morocco)
Moroccan economists
Moroccan educators
People from Boujad
Academic staff of Mohammed V University
Socialist Union of Popular Forces politicians